Pandora Island is a member of the Arctic Archipelago in the territory of Nunavut. It lies in Peel Sound at the entrance of Prince of Wales Island's Young Bay, while Somerset Island's Four Rivers Bay is to the east. The larger Prescott Island is to the north.

References

External links 
 Pandora Island in the Atlas of Canada - Toporama; Natural Resources Canada

Uninhabited islands of Qikiqtaaluk Region